Herbert L. Smith was an American football player and coach. He served as the head football coach at Wayne State University in Detroit, Michigan in 1948 and from 1955 to 1959, compiling a record of 19–21–3. Smith played college football at Michigan State Normal College—now known as Eastern Michigan University.

Head coaching record

College

References

Year of birth missing
Year of death missing
Eastern Michigan Eagles football players
Texas A&M Aggies football coaches
Wayne State Warriors football coaches